Mark Cleland Baker (born 1959) is an American linguist. He received his Ph.D. from MIT in 1985 and has taught at Rutgers University since 1998. Baker frequently was a faculty member at the Linguistic Society of America's Summer Institute and, prior to coming to Rutgers, was a faculty member at McGill University (1986–1998). He worked with the Mohawk language for several years, also serving as a consultant on language revitalization for the Mohawk. Working within generative grammar, he has written several books about the formal analysis of polysynthetic languages.

Bibliography
Incorporation: A theory of grammatical function changing (University of Chicago Press, 1988) 
 The Polysynthesis Parameter (Oxford University Press, 1996)
 The Atoms of Language (Basic Books, 2001)
 Lexical Categories: Verbs, Nouns and Adjectives (Cambridge University Press, 2002)
 The Syntax of Agreement and Concord (Cambridge University Press, 2008)
 The Soul Hypothesis: Investigations into the Existence of the Soul (Continuum, 2011) – editor (with Stewart Goetz) and contributor

References

Linguists from the United States
Living people
1959 births
MIT School of Humanities, Arts, and Social Sciences alumni
Rutgers University alumni
Native American language revitalization
Rutgers University faculty
Academic staff of McGill University
Linguists of Uto-Aztecan languages
Fellows of the Linguistic Society of America